Pichdeh (also Romanized as Pīchdeh) is a village in Owzrud Rural District, Baladeh District, Nur County, Mazandaran Province, Iran. At the 2006 census, its population was 16, in 7 families.

It is the birthplace of Mirza Husain Noori Tabarsi (Persian: میرزا حسین نوری طبرسی, Arabic: الميرزا حسين النوري الطبرسي) (1838 - 1902) popularly known as Muhaddis Noori who was a top Shi'a Islamic cleric and father of Islamic Shi'a Renaissance.

References 

Populated places in Nur County